A by-election was held for the Australian House of Representatives seat of Kennedy on 12 December 1936. This was triggered by the death of Labor MP Darby Riordan.

The by-election was won by the Labor candidate, Riordan's nephew Bill.

Results

References

1936 elections in Australia
Queensland federal by-elections
1930s in Queensland